Reading Madame Bovary (2010) is a collection of short stories by Australian author Amanda Lohrey. It won the Fiction Prize and Arts Queensland Steele Rudd Australian Short Story Award at the Queensland Premier's Literary Awards in 2011.

Contents
 "Primates"
 "Reading Madame Bovary"
 "Ground Zero"
 "Freedom, Order and the Golden Bead Material"
 "Perfect"
 "The Art of Convalesence"
 "The Existence of Other Men"
 "John Lennon's Gardener"
 "Letter to the Romans"

Reviews
Carol Middleton in Overland was impressed by the stories: "Lohrey has a remarkable ability to be lyrical and profound while keeping both feet in the here and now of Australian life. For a ‘literary’ writer, she is refreshingly comfortable with the mundane minutiae of modern life (to-do lists and washing up) and, from there, teases out the themes and issues that lie beneath the surface of contemporary consciousness."

Awards and nominations
 2011 winner Queensland Premier's Literary Awards – Best Fiction Book 
 2011 winner Queensland Premier's Literary Awards – Arts Queensland Steele Rudd Australian Short Story Award

References

2010 short story collections
Australian short story collections
Black Inc books